

Radio City 
Radio City is a commercial radio station in Bulgaria aimed at young people. The format of Radio City is CHR, playing the biggest current hits from popular music genres (Pop, R&B, Dance etc.).

History 
Radio City was founded in 1998 as an association between Kamen Spasov and Jonas Siljemark. Radio City began broadcasting in February 2001, first in the capital Sofia at 99.7 MHz and later in Plovdiv, Varna, Stara Zagora, Blagoevgrad and Kyustendil. In 2007 it won a license for Lovech. From August 19, 2008 Radio City broadcasts in Ruse (until 3 September 2010) and Veliko Tarnovo (until 24 May 2010). Radio City program is also transmitted via cable and satellite operators in Bulgaria. In 2005 the media created and began broadcasting a music television channel called City TV (Bulgaria).

Frequencies 
 Sofia - 99.70 MHz
 Plovdiv - 91.1 MHz
 Varna - 98.6 MHz
 Stara Zagora - 96.8 MHz
 Blagoevgrad - 95.0 MHz
 Kyustendil - 88.5 MHz
 Lovech - 87.6 MHz
 Pazardzhik - 96.4 MHz
 Balchik-Kaliakra 89.0 MHz

Via Satellite 
Satellite: Intelsat 12
Position: 45 East,
Frequency: 11.632 GHz,
Polarization: Vertical,
Symbol rate: 20.000 Mbit/s, 
FEC: 3/4
SID:11, 
APID:62

Online 
 https://web.archive.org/web/20070917090645/http://radio.city.bg/

External links 
 
 Communicorp corporate website

Radio stations in Bulgaria
Radio stations established in 1998
Mass media in Sofia